Uvero Alto is a beach and resort area located at the north end of the tourist town Punta Cana in the province of La Altagracia in the Dominican Republic. A number of all-inclusive resort hotels are built along these beaches on the east coast of Hispaniola. 

Populated places in La Altagracia Province
Beaches of the Dominican Republic